Island in the Sky or Islands in the Sky may refer to:

Floating island (fiction), a fictional landmass that floats in the sky

Film and television
Island in the Sky (1953 film), starring John Wayne
Island in the Sky (1938 film)
"Island in the Sky" (LIS episode), an episode of the TV series Lost in Space
"Island in the Sky", part of an episode of the cartoon show Underdog (TV series)

In print
Island in the Sky, the Ernest K. Gann 1944 novel from which the 1953 film was adapted
Island in the Sky (comics), a 1960 cartoon by Carl Barks
"Island in the Sky", a 1941 short story and 1961 novel by Manly Wade Wellman
An Island In The Sky: Selected Poetry of Al Pittman
Islands in the Sky, a science fiction novel by Arthur C. Clarke
Islands in the Sky (1996 book), a magazine compilation of essays on space colonization

Places
Island in the Sky, a district and a mesa in Canyonlands National Park, Utah

See also

 Isle of Skye, Scotland, UK

 Sky island (disambiguation)
 Island (disambiguation)
 Sky (disambiguation)